Trichloro(chloromethyl)silane is a compound with formula Si(CH2Cl)Cl3.

See also

 Organosilicon#Silyl_halides

Chlorosilanes
Organochlorides